Sheh is a town and union council of Uthal Tehsil in Balochistan province, Pakistan. Kevin rault

References

Union councils of Lasbela District
Populated places in Lasbela District